Anthony Miller (born October 9, 1994) is an American football wide receiver for the Pittsburgh Steelers of the National Football League (NFL). He played college football at Memphis.

Early years
Miller attended Christian Brothers High School in Memphis, Tennessee, where he played football and ran track for the Purple Wave athletic teams.

College career
Miller joined the University of Memphis football team as a walk-on. He redshirted in 2013 and then again in 2014 due to an injury. In 2015, he played in 12 games and made four starts, recording 47 receptions for 694 yards with five receiving touchdowns and two rushing touchdowns. In 2016, Miller started all 13 games and set school records with 95 receptions for 1,434 yards and 14 touchdowns. During his senior season in 2017, he broke Duke Calhoun's school records for career receptions and receiving yards, Carlos Singleton's school record for career receiving touchdowns, and his own outright record for single-season receiving touchdowns and shared record for single-game receiving touchdowns.

Collegiate statistics

Professional career

Chicago Bears

2018
Miller was drafted by the Chicago Bears in the second round, 51st overall, of the 2018 NFL Draft. He was the sixth wide receiver to be selected that year.

In his NFL debut against the Green Bay Packers in the season opener, he had two receptions for 14 yards in the 24–23 defeat on NBC Sunday Night Football. In the following game, a 24–17 victory over the Seattle Seahawks on Monday Night Football, he recorded his first professional touchdown reception. The third game of the year against the Arizona Cardinals saw Miller catch four passes for 35 yards, but he left the game early with a dislocated shoulder.

On October 14, caught a 29-yard touchdown pass against the Miami Dolphins, his second of the season, in the 31–28 overtime loss. Two weeks later, Miller caught three passes for 37 yards and a touchdown, his third of the season, against the New York Jets. In Week 10 against the Detroit Lions, Miller caught five passes for 122 yards and a touchdown. The Bears won the game by a score of 34–22.

In Week 13 against the New York Giants, Miller caught the game-tying touchdown pass in regulation on a trick play: quarterback Chase Daniel tossed the ball to tight end Trey Burton, who then tossed it to running back Tarik Cohen, who threw it to Miller for the touchdown. Miller's touchdown sent the game into overtime, tied 27–27. Unfortunately, the Bears lost to the Giants in overtime 30–27 after the Bears failed to convert a fourth down in overtime.

In Week 16 against the San Francisco 49ers, Miller was ejected after he got in a fight with safety Marcell Harris.  Miller attacked Harris after he hit quarterback Mitchell Trubisky as he was sliding to the ground. In addition, fellow Bears wide receiver Josh Bellamy and 49ers cornerback Richard Sherman were ejected from the game. Before he was ejected, he had three catches for 24 yards and a touchdown. The Bears won the game 14–9.

Miller finished his rookie season with 33 catches for 423 yards and seven touchdowns. His seven touchdowns led the team and were the most by a Bears rookie since Willie Gault had seven in 1983; he also ranked second in the league among rookie receivers behind the Atlanta Falcons' Calvin Ridley. He received an overall grade of 60.6 from Pro Football Focus in 2018, which ranked as the 92nd-highest grade among all qualifying wide receivers.

2019

During the Thanksgiving Series against the Detroit Lions in Week 13, Miller finished with a career-high nine catches for 140 receiving yards as the Bears won 24–20. In the following week's game against the Dallas Cowboys on Thursday Night Football, Miller caught three passes for 42 yards and his first touchdown of the season in the 31–24 win. In Week 15 against the Green Bay Packers, Miller caught nine passes for 118 yards and a touchdown during the 21–13 loss. Overall, Miller finished the 2019 season with 52 receptions for 656 receiving yards and two receiving touchdowns.

2020
In the 2020 season opener against the Detroit Lions, Miller scored the go-ahead touchdown with 1:55 remaining on a 27-yard reception from Trubisky; Miller's assignment, a fly route from the right slot receiver position, was the same pattern he ran in the 2019 Thanksgiving game that resulted in a 32-yard catch. Miller ended the 27–23 victory with four catches for 76 yards.
In Week 3 against the Atlanta Falcons, Miller caught a 28-yard touchdown pass late in the fourth quarter to help the Bears come back to win the game 30–26. He finished the 2020 season with 49 receptions for 485 receiving yards and two receiving touchdowns. Miller was ejected from the Wild Card Round of the 2020–21 NFL playoffs for hitting New Orleans Saints cornerback C. J. Gardner-Johnson. Miller caught two passes for 22 yards prior to being disqualified from the game.

Houston Texans
On July 26, 2021, Miller was traded to the Houston Texans along with a 2022 seventh-round pick for a 2022 fifth-round pick. He scored his first touchdown as a Texan in Week 3 against Carolina. He played in two games before being released on October 6, 2021.

Pittsburgh Steelers
On October 12, 2021, Miller was signed to the Pittsburgh Steelers practice squad. He was elevated to the active roster from the practice squad on November 27, 2021. He signed a reserve/future contract with the Steelers on January 24, 2022.

On August 16, 2022, Miller was placed on injured reserve with a season-ending shoulder injury.

On January 17, 2023, Miller signed a one-year contract extension with the Steelers.

Career statistics

References

External links

Twitter
Pittsburgh Steelers bio
Memphis Tigers bio

1994 births
Living people
Players of American football from Memphis, Tennessee
American football wide receivers
Memphis Tigers football players
All-American college football players
Chicago Bears players
Houston Texans players
Pittsburgh Steelers players